Charles Upson Clark (1875–1960) was a professor of history at Columbia University. He discovered the Barberini Codex, the earliest Aztec writings on herbal medicines extant.

Biography
Clark was born in 1875 to Edward Perkins Clark and Catharine Pickens Upson.  Throughout his life he was the author of many books on a variety of subjects. Among them was the history of West Indies by Antonio Vázquez de Espinosa translated into English, and the modern history of Romania.

He also collaborated with the American School of Classical Studies in Rome, where he held a directory of Classical Studies and Archaeology since 1910. He died in 1960.

Works
 "The Text Tradition of Ammianus Marcellinus", 1904
 "Greater Roumania", Dodd, Mead and Company, 1922. Chapter X
 "Bessarabia, Russia and Roumania on the Black Sea", Dodd, Mead and Company,  1927.  Electronic Text Archive

References

External links
 
  Steven Foster, The Badianus Manuscript: The First Herbal from the Americas, 1992
 Azcatitlan Codex
 Bio info
 El Consejo Real y Supremo de las Indias: Su historia, organizacion, y labor administrativo hasta la terminacion de la Casa de Austria
 The Birth of the Romanian State
 Society of Fellows, American Academy in Rome

American historians
Columbia University faculty
1875 births
1960 deaths
Fellows of the Medieval Academy of America